Metalwood is the first album by Canadian jazz fusion band Metalwood.  It won the Juno Award for best contemporary jazz album.

Track listing

 "5 Minute Margin" (Turner) - 11:20
 "Mr. Jack" (Tarry) - 8:13
 "New Congregation" (Turner) - 6:29
 "Not Disappointed" (Metalwood) - 3:00
 "Lateral" (Turner) - 7:10
 "Crunchman" (Metalwood) - 5:36
 "Hey, Longhair!" (Tarry) - 5:01
 "And Loving It" (Metalwood) - 5:06
 "Square" (Murley) - 7:06
 "Big Delivery" (Metalwood) - 7:41
 "T & LC" (Metalwood) - 3:25

Personnel
Mike Murley - tenor & soprano saxes
Brad Turner - trumpet, keyboards
Chris Tarry - bass
Ian Froman - drums

References 
Citations

1997 albums
Metalwood albums
Juno Award for Contemporary Jazz Album of the Year albums
Jazz fusion albums by Canadian artists